Llywelyn is a given name and surname of Welsh origin. See also Llywelyn (name).

Llywelyn may also refer to:

Places
Llewellyn, Tasmania, Australia, a village
Llewellyn, Pennsylvania, United States, an unincorporated community

Other uses
Llewellyn Formation, Pennsylvania, United States, a geologic formation
Llewellyn baronets, two titles in the Baronetage of the United Kingdom, one extant
Llewellyn Worldwide, a New Age and Occult publishing house
Llewellin Setter, a field dog bred from the English Setter by Englishman R. Purcell Llewellin (1840–1925)
HMS Llewellyn, two ships of the Royal Navy
the title character of Lloyd Llewellyn, comic book series by Daniel Clowes
"Llewellyn", a song on the album Marin County Line by New Riders Of The Purple Sage

See also
Carnedd Llewelyn, a mountain in Snowdonia, North Wales
Llywelyn's coronet, crown seized by Edward I in 1284
Lewellen, Nebraska, a village